Miller is a city in and county seat of Hand County, South Dakota, United States. The population was 1,349 at the 2020 census.

History
The city was named for its founder, Henry Miller.
The post office has been in operation since 1881.

Geography

Miller has been assigned the ZIP code 57362.

Climate

Demographics

2010 census
As of the census of 2010, there were 1,489 people, 724 households, and 396 families living in the city. The racial makeup of the city was 97.8% White, 0.2% African American, 0.5% Native American, 0.1% Asian, 0.3% from other races, and 1.1% from two or more races. Hispanic or Latino of any race were 0.6% of the population.

There were 724 households, of which 20.3% had children under the age of 18 living with them, 46.1% were married couples living together, 7.5% had a female householder with no husband present, 1.1% had a male householder with no wife present, and 45.3% were non-families. 43.2% of all households were made up of individuals, and 25.4% had someone living alone who was 65 years of age or older. The average household size was 1.97 and the average family size was 2.70.

The median age in the city was 51.2 years. 18.9% of residents were under the age of 18; 4.6% were between the ages of 18 and 24; 17.8% were from 25 to 44; 25.5% were from 45 to 64; and 33.2% were 65 years of age or older. The gender makeup of the city was 45.9% male and 54.1% female.

2000 census
As of the census of 2000, there were 1,530 people, 720 households, and 406 families living in the city. The population density was 1,614.1 people per square mile (621.8/km2). There were 845 housing units at an average density of 891.4 per square mile (343.4/km2). The racial makeup of the city was 99.15% White, 0.07% African American, 0.13% Native American, 0.07% Asian, 0.20% from other races, and 0.39% from two or more races. Hispanic or Latino of any race were 0.26% of the population.

There were 720 households, out of which 21.4% had children under the age of 18 living with them, 48.6% were married couples living together, 6.1% had a female householder with no husband present, and 43.5% were non-families. 41.9% of all households were made up of individuals, and 26.4% had someone living alone who was 65 years of age or older. The average household size was 2.03 and the average family size was 2.77.

In the city, the population was spread out, with 19.1% under the age of 18, 4.4% from 18 to 24, 21.1% from 25 to 44, 22.1% from 45 to 64, and 33.3% who were 65 years of age or older. The median age was 49 years. For every 100 females, there were 83.7 males. For every 100 females age 18 and over, there were 78.9 males.

As of 2000 the median income for a household in the city was $28,929, and the median income for a family was $39,293. Males had a median income of $25,962 versus $17,216 for females. The per capita income for the city was $18,401. About 4.2% of families and 9.5% of the population were below the poverty line, including 8.2% of those under age 18 and 12.2% of those age 65 or over.

Notable people
 Harlan J. Bushfield, U.S. Senator and Governor of South Dakota
 Vera C. Bushfield, interim U.S. Senator, wife of Harlan Bushfield
 Neil Fulton, Dean of University of South Dakota School of Law
 Dale Hargens, member of the South Dakota House of Representatives
 John B. Heilman, member of the South Dakota House of Representatives
 Frank Henderson, justice of the South Dakota Supreme Court
 James Jones, member of the South Dakota House of Representatives
 John L. Pyle, Attorney General of South Dakota

Popular culture
Miller was the focal point of a 2002 episode of “This American Life” discussing a racial incident that occurred in the town.

See also
 List of cities in South Dakota

References

External links

 
 Miller, South Dakota

Cities in South Dakota
Cities in Hand County, South Dakota
County seats in South Dakota